The Champion Jockey of flat racing in Germany is the jockey who has ridden the most winning horses during a season. The list of the Champion Jockey started 1870. The list below shows the Champion Jockey for each year since 1984.

Champion Jockey
 2022 Bauyrzhan Murzabayev
 2021 Bauyrzhan Murzabayev
 2020 Bauyrzhan Murzabayev
 2019 Bauyrzhan Murzabayev
 2018 Andrasch Starke
 2017 Filip Minarik and Alexander Pietsch
 2016 Filip Minarik
 2015 Alexander Pietsch and Andrasch Starke
 2014 Adrie de Vries 
 2013 Andrasch Starke
 2012 Andrasch Starke
 2011 Filip Minarik
 2010 Eduardo Pedroza 
 2009 Eduardo Pedroza 
 2008 Eduardo Pedroza 
 2007 Eduardo Pedroza 
 2006 Andreas Suborics 		 
 2005 Filip Minarik 		 
 2004 Andreas Suboric	 
 2003 Andrasch Starke 		 
 2002 	Andreas Suboric 		 
 2001 	Andrasch Starke		 
 2000 	Andrasch Starke		 
 1999 	Andrasch Starke		 
 1998 	Andrasch Starke 	  		  	  	  	  	 
 1997 	Kevin Woodburn 	  	  	  	  	  	 
 1996 	Peter Schiergen 	  	 	  	  	 
 1995 	Peter Schiergen 	  	  	  	  	 
 1994 	Peter Schiergen 		  	  	  	  	 
 1993 	Peter Schiergen 	  	  	  	  	  	 
 1992 	Peter Schiergen 	  	  	  	  	  	 
 1991 	Andrzej Tylicki 	  	  	  	  	 
 1989 	Georg Bocskai 	  	  	  	  	  	 
 1988 	Manfred Hofer 	   	  	  	  	  	 
 1987 	Manfred Hofer	  	 	  	  	  	  	 
 1986 	Andrzej Tylicki 	 	  	  	  	  	 
 1985 	Georg Bocskai 	  		  	  	  	  	 
 1984 	Peter Alafi und Georg Bocskai
 1969	Fritz Drechsler
 1968	Peter Remmert
 1967	Peter Remmert
 1966	Oskar Langner 
 1965	Peter Remmert
 1964	Horst Horwart
 1963	Fritz Drechsler
 1962	Peter Alafi
 1961	Hein Bollow
 1960	Hein Bollow
 1959	Hein Bollow
 1958	Hein Bollow
 1957	Hein Bollow
 1956	Hein Bollow
 1955	Hein Bollow
 1954	Walter Held 
 1953	Walter Held 
 1952	Hein Bollow
 1951	Hein Bollow
 1950	Hein Bollow
 1949	Hein Bollow
 1948	Hein Bollow
 1947	Hein Bollow
 1946	Hans Zehmisch
 1945	Oskar Langner
 1944	Hans Zehmisch
 1943	Hans Zehmisch
 1942	Hans Zehmisch
 1941	Otto Schmidt
 1940	Otto Schmidt
 1939	Otto Schmidt
 1938	M. Schmidt
 1937	Hans Zehmisch
 1936	Otto Schmidt
 1935	Willi Printen
 1934	Willi Printen
 1933	Willi Printen
 1932	Everett Haynes
 1931	Ernst F. Grabsch
 1930	Ernst F. Grabsch
 1929	Ernst F. Grabsch
 1928	Otto Schmidt
 1927	Otto Schmidt
 1926	Otto Schmidt
 1925	Everett Haynes
 1924	Otto Schmidt
 1923	Otto Schmidt
 1922	Otto Schmidt
 1921	Anton Olejnik
 1920	Otto Schmidt
 1919	Otto Schmidt
 1918	F. Kasper
 1917	Albert Schlaefke
 1916	George Archibald
 1915	George Archibald
 1914	George Archibald
 1913	George Archibald
 1912	Frank Bullock
 1911	Frank Bullock
 1910	F. Bullock
 1909	Frank Bullock
 1908	Frank Bullock
 1907	Tommy Burns
 1906	O'Connor
 1905	H. Aylin
 1904	W. Warne
 1903	W. Warne
 1902	E. Martin
 1901	E. Martin und R. Utting
 1900	R. Utting
 1899	W. Warne
 1898	W. Warne
 1897	Ch. Ballantine
 1896	W. Warne
 1895	W. Warne
 1894	Ch. Ballantine
 1893	Ch. Ballantine
 1892	Frank Sharpe
 1891	Ch. Ballantine
 1890	Ch. Ballantine
 1889	Ch. Ballantine
 1888	Ch. Ballantine
 1887	Ch. Ballantine
 1886	G. Sopp
 1885	Harry Jeffery
 1884	G. Sopp
 1883	Harry Jeffery
 1882	G. Sopp
 1881	G. Sopp
 1880	G. Sopp
 1879	G. Sopp
 1878	G. Sopp
 1877	G. Sopp
 1876	Whitheley
 1875	E. Fisk, W. Little und G. Sopp
 1874	Wilson
 1873	G. Sopp
 1872	Eric Madden
 1871	Eric Madden
 1870	Eric Madden

See also
 German flat racing Champion Trainer
 British flat racing Champion Jockey

External links
 list of Champion Jockey since 1870

References

Horse races in Germany
Champion jockeys